"Loving You Easy" is a song recorded by American country music group Zac Brown Band. It was released as the third single from the band's fourth studio album, Jekyll + Hyde, on May 4, 2015.  The song was written by Zac Brown, Al Anderson and Niko Moon.

Content
The song features "perky instrumentation… sprinkled with soul, funk, and fiddle" and a "fattening bass riff". Lyrically, it is "about being in love with a good woman".

Critical reception

Thom Jurek of Allmusic, in his review of the album, wrote that "The Caribbean-tinged tunes such as 'Loving You Easy,' with its Buffett-esque groove wed to retro pop/soul and 'One Day,' with its sweeping yet earthy fiddle, horns, and stirring backing choruses, are both winners, too." Giving it a "B", Jim Casey of Country Weekly called the song "a Cool Whip song—sweet and fluffy, without too many calories" but praised the instrumentation and "sugary harmony".

Personnel
Compiled from liner notes.

 Zac Brown - lead vocals, electric guitar
 Coy Bowles - Hammond organ, Wurlitzer electric piano
 Clay Cook - background vocals, electric guitar, Mellotron
 Daniel de los Reyes - percussion
 Chris Fryar - drums
 John Driskell Hopkins - background vocals, acoustic guitar
 Matt Mangano - bass guitar
 Jimmy De Martini - background vocals, violin, strings
 Ben Simonetti - programming

Music video
The music video was directed by Danny Clinch and premiered in May 2015. The video stars actress Halston Sage. None of the members of Zac Brown Band appear in the video, however, save for a brief view of the front cover of an LP copy of its Jekyll + Hyde album.

Chart performance
The song debuted at number 30 on the Country Airplay chart dated May 9, 2015, and No. 42 on the Country Digital Songs chart with 8,000 copies sold.  It also debuted on Country Airplay at No. 30 and Hot Country Songs at No. 34 the same week. It debuted on the Hot 100  at No. 90 for chart dated June 13. As of September 2015, the song has sold 377,000 copies in the United States.

Year-end charts

Certifications

References

2015 songs
2015 singles
Zac Brown Band songs
Big Machine Records singles
Republic Records singles
Songs written by Al Anderson (NRBQ)
Songs written by Zac Brown
Songs written by Niko Moon